, also released as Muhomatsu, the Rickshaw Man or The Rikisha-Man, is a 1958 color Japanese film directed by Hiroshi Inagaki.  It is a remake of his own 1943 film. In the 1943 version Tsumasaburo Bando played the role of Muhōmatsu. In October 2020, a digitally re-mastered 83 minutes long version of the original B/W film in 4K quality was released in Tokyo at the Tokyo International Film Festival, with a Blue Ray disk going on sale on 26 March 2021.

Set in Japan during the late 19th century up to the early 20th century, it tells the story of Matsugoro, a rickshaw man played by Toshiro Mifune, who becomes a surrogate father to the child of a recently widowed woman played by Hideko Takamine.

Cast 
Toshiro Mifune - Matsugoro (Muhōmatsu, "Wild Matsu")
Hideko Takamine - Yoshiko Yoshioka
Hiroshi Akutagawa - Capt. Kotaro Yoshioka
Chishū Ryū - Shigezo Yuki
Choko Iida - Otora (innkeeper)
Haruo Tanaka - Kumakichi
Jun Tatara - Theatre employee
Kenji Kasahara - Toshio Yoshioka
Dump Matsumoto - Young Toshio
Nobuo Nakamura - Yoshiko's brother
Ichirō Arishima - Medicine peddler
Chieko Nakakita - Yoshiko's sister-in-law
Seiji Miyaguchi - Fencing master
Bokuzen Hidari

Awards 
Director Hiroshi Inagaki won the Golden Lion award at the Venice Film Festival in 1958.

Manga 
A manga based on Rickshaw Man was published by Shueisha and serialized in the Weekly Shōnen Jump.

References

External links 
  無法松の一生
 

1958 films
Films directed by Hiroshi Inagaki
Golden Lion winners
1970 manga
Films produced by Tomoyuki Tanaka
Toho films
Remakes of Japanese films
Films set in the Meiji period
1950s Japanese films